Khawzawl College is an Indian college that was established on 4 March 1985 in Khawzawl, Khawzawl district of Mizoram. The college is affiliated to Mizoram University. There were 18 students admitted in 2012–23.

Departments
The college has departments of English, history, education, political science, economics, sociology and Mizo.

References

External links
  

Universities and colleges in Mizoram
Colleges affiliated to Mizoram University